Lennart Hemming (13 May 1932 – 19 April 2002) was a Swedish footballer. He played in four matches for the Sweden national football team from 1963 to 1965.

References

1932 births
2002 deaths
Swedish footballers
Sweden international footballers
Place of birth missing
Association footballers not categorized by position